SouthWest Energy Ltd is an Ethiopian oil and gas exploration and production company located in Addis Ababa, Ethiopia. The company was established in 2005 by Tewodros Ashenafi.  It is registered in Hong Kong.

In December 2005, SouthWest Energy signed a production sharing agreement with the Ministry of Mines and Energy of Ethiopia for blocks 9 and 13 in the Ogaden Basin. The company plans to raise $100 million via a private placement in the first quarter of 2013 to help finance a three-well drilling program in the Ogaden Basin. In addition, the company owns acreages at the Gambella and Jijiga basins.

See also

 Energy in Ethiopia

References

Oil and gas companies of Ethiopia
Non-renewable resource companies established in 2005
2005 establishments in Ethiopia